Braden Wilson (born October 9, 1989) is a former American football fullback. He played college football at Kansas State. The Chiefs drafted him in the 6th round of the 2013 NFL Draft. Wilson was the 204th overall pick of the Draft.

Professional career
Wilson was selected in the sixth round with the 204th overall pick in the 2013 NFL Draft by the Kansas City Chiefs. On August 25, 2013, he was cut by the Chiefs.

References

External links
Braden Wilson Draft Profile – NFL.com

1989 births
Living people
American football fullbacks
Kansas City Chiefs players
Kansas State Wildcats football players
People from Smith Center, Kansas
Players of American football from Kansas